Gjesdal is a small farming village in Gjesdal municipality in Rogaland county, Norway. The village is the site of Gjesdal Church. The area is locally referred to as Bygda ("the village").

References

Villages in Rogaland
Gjesdal